Werner Bärtschi (born 1 January 1950) is a Swiss composer and classical pianist.

Life 
Born in Zurich, Bärtschi studied piano with Sava Savoff, Jürg Wyttenbach and Rolf Mäser, composition with Armin Schibler, Klaus Huber and Rudolf Kelterborn and orchestral conducting with Erich Schmid at the Universities of Zurich and Basel. He was influenced by the music of John Cage and Dieter Schnebel.

In 1980, Bärtschi founded the concert series Rezital Zürich. In 1987, he became artistic director of the Musikkollegium Zürcher Oberland. From 1990 to 1992, he was president of the music commission of the city of Zurich. He is also the initiator of cycles and festivals such as the Satie season (1980/81), the Ives cycle (1985/86) and the June Festival Week (1991).

He brought works by John Cage, Klaus Huber, Wladimir Rudolfowitsch Vogel, Dieter Schnebel, Terry Riley and Wilhelm Killmayer to their world premieres.

In 1983, he won the Grand Prix du Disque.

Recordings 
 Pierre Mariétan (Grammont Porträt, 1992)
 Kreuzende Wege – Komponistensekretariat Zürich (Grammont Porträt, 1997)
 Basel Sinfonietta (Grammont Porträt, 2001)
 Rotondo or "die Kunst des Fügens" (stv/asm, 2002)
 Marcela Pavia – Max E. Keller (NEOS, 2011)

Further reading 
 Ingo Harden: Werner Bärtschi. In Ingo Harden, Gregor Willmes: Pianistenprofile: 600 Interpreten: ihre Biografie, ihr Stil, ihre Aufnahmen. Bärenreiter, Kassel 2008, p. 51f.
 Axel Schniederjürgen (ed.): Kürschners Musiker-Handbuch. 5th edition, K. G. Saur Verlag, Munich 2006, .

References

External links 
 
 

1950 births
Living people
Musicians from Zürich
Swiss classical pianists
20th-century classical composers
20th-century Swiss composers